Veyiten Lecha is a collection of verses recited by Jews on Saturday night at the conclusion of Shabbat. Nusach Ashkenaz and the Italian Nusach recite this towards the end of the Maariv service, whereas Sephardim and Nusach Sefard postpone it until after the Havdalah ceremony.  The version recited in the Eastern Ashkenazic rite is quite lengthy; the Western Ashkenazic rite recites a smaller selection of verses, and the Italian rite recites yet a different selection of verses.

References

Shabbat prayers
Hebrew words and phrases in Jewish prayers and blessings